

See also

 List of terrorist incidents in Punjab (India)
 Kharku

References

Insurgency in Punjab